The Winnipeg Light Infantry was an infantry regiment of the Non-Permanent Active Militia of the Canadian Militia (now the Canadian Army). In 1955, the regiment was amalgamated with The Royal Winnipeg Rifles.

Lineage

The Winnipeg Light Infantry 

 Originated on 1 April 1912, in Winnipeg, Manitoba, as the 106th Regiment, Winnipeg Light Infantry.
 Redesignated on 12 March 1920, as The Winnipeg Light Infantry.
 Redesignated on 15 December 1936, as The Winnipeg Light Infantry (Machine Gun).
 Redesignated on 18 March 1942, as the 2nd (Reserve) Battalion, The Winnipeg Light Infantry (Machine Gun).
 Redesignated on 1 June 1945, as The Winnipeg Light Infantry (Machine Gun).
 Redesignated on 1 April 1946, as The Winnipeg Light Infantry.
 Amalgamated on 30 June 1955, with The Royal Winnipeg Rifles.

Perpetuations

North West Rebellion 

 91st Winnipeg Battalion of Light Infantry (1885–1888)

The Great War 

 10th Battalion (Canadians), CEF
 61st Battalion (Winnipeg), CEF
 101st Battalion (Winnipeg Light Infantry), CEF
 222nd Battalion, CEF
 226th Battalion (Men of the North), CEF

History

Early History

91st Winnipeg Light Infantry Battalion (1885–1888) 
On 10 April 1885, a Battalion of Light Infantry at Winnipeg was authorized to be formed and was mobilized for active service during the North West Rebellion. On 15 May 1885, the battalion was redesignated as the Winnipeg Light Infantry Battalion. The battalion served in the Alberta Column of the North West Field Force and on 18 September 1885, the battalion was removed from active service. The Winnipeg Light Infantry Battalion was Retained on the order of battle of the Non-Permanent Active Militia and on 2 April 1886, the battalion was redesignated as the 91st Winnipeg Light Infantry Battalion. On 23 November 1888, the 91st Winnipeg Light Infantry Battalion was disbanded.

106th Regiment, Winnipeg Light Infantry 
On 1 April 1912, the 106th Regiment, Winnipeg Light Infantry was authorized. Its Regimental Headquarters and all companies were located in Winnipeg.

The First World War 
Details of the 106th Regiment, Winnipeg Light Infantry were placed on active service on 6 August 1914 for local protection duties.

On 10 August 1914, the 10th Battalion (Canadians), CEF was authorized and on 29 September 1914, the battalion embarked for Great Britain. On 14 February 1915, the battalion disembarked in France where it fought as part of the 2nd Canadian Infantry Brigade, 1st Canadian Division in France and Flanders until the end of the war on 11 November 1918. On 15 September 1920, the 10th Battalion, CEF was disbanded.

On 20 April 1915, the 61st Battalion (Winnipeg), CEF was authorized and on 5 April 1915, the battalion embarked for Great Britain. After its arrival in the UK, the battalion provided reinforcements to the Canadian Corps in the field. On 7 July 1916, the battalion’s personnel were absorbed by the 11th Reserve Battalion, CEF. On 17 July 1917, the 61st Battalion, CEF was disbanded.

On 22 December 1915, the 101st Battalion (Winnipeg Light Infantry), CEF was authorized and on 29 June 1916, the battalion embarked for Great Britain. After its arrival in the UK, on 13 July 1916, the battalion’s personnel were absorbed by the 17th Reserve Battalion, CEF to provide reinforcements to the Canadian Corps in the field. On 12 October 1917, the 101st Battalion, CEF was disbanded.

On 15 July 1916, the 222nd Battalion, CEF was authorized and on 15 November 1916, the battalion embarked for Great Britain. After its arrival in the UK, the battalion provided reinforcements to the Canadian Corps in the field. On 2 January 1917, the battalion’s personnel were absorbed by the 19th Reserve Battalion, CEF. On 1 September 1917, the 222nd Battalion, CEF was disbanded.

On 15 July 1916, the 226th Battalion (Men of the North), CEF was authorized and on 16 December 1916, the battalion embarked for Great Britain. After its arrival in the UK, the battalion provided reinforcements to the Canadian Corps in the field. On 7 April 1917, the battalion’s personnel were absorbed by the 14th Reserve Battalion, CEF. On 27 July 1917, the 226th Battalion, CEF was disbanded.

1920s–1930s 
On 15 March 1920, as a result of the reorganization of the Canadian Militia following the Otter Commission, the 106th Regiment, Winnipeg Light Infantry was redesignated as The Winnipeg Light Infantry.

On 15 December 1936, as a result of the 1936 Canadian Militia Reorganization, The Winnipeg Light Infantry was Reorganized as an Infantry Battalion (Machine Gun) and redesignated as The Winnipeg Light Infantry (Machine Gun).

The Second World War 
On 26 August 1939, Details of The Winnipeg Light Infantry (Machine Gun) were called out on service and on 1 September 1939, were placed on active service under the designation The Winnipeg Light Infantry (Machine Gun), CASF for local protection duties. On 31 December 1940, the details called out on active service were disbanded.

On 1 January 1941, Details of the regiment were again called out on service as the 1st (Reserve) Battalion, The Winnipeg Light Infantry (Machine Gun), but they were disbanded the same day.

On 18 March 1942, the regiment mobilized the 1st Battalion, The Winnipeg Light Infantry, CASF for active service. The battalion served in Canada in a home defence role as part of the 19th Canadian Infantry Brigade, 8th Canadian Infantry Division; the 16th Canadian Infantry Brigade, 7th Canadian Infantry Division; and the 14th Canadian Infantry Brigade, 6th Canadian Infantry Division. On 3 January 1945, the battalion embarked for Great Britain, and after its arrival in the UK, the 1st Battalion, The Winnipeg Light Infantry, CASF was disbanded on 10 January 1945, to provided reinforcements to the Canadian Army in the field.

Alliances 
 - The Durham Light Infantry (1914–1955)

Battle Honours

North West Rebellion 

 North West Canada, 1885

Great War 

 Ypres, 1915, '17
 Gravenstafel
 St. Julien
 Festubert, 1915
 Mount Sorrel
 Somme, 1916
 Thiepval
 Ancre Heights
 Arras, 1917, '18
 Vimy, 1917
 Arleux
 Hill 70
 Passchendaele
 Amiens
 Scarpe, 1918
 Drocourt-Quéant
 Hindenburg Line
 Canal du Nord
 Pursuit to Mons
 France and Flanders, 1915–18

Notable Members 

 Lieutenant Colonel William Osborne Smith

Notes and references 

Winnipeg Light Infantry
Light Infantry regiments of Canada
Infantry regiments of Canada in World War II
Military units and formations disestablished in 1955